Helen Margaret Lederer (born 24 September 1954) is an English comedian, writer and actress who emerged as part of the alternative comedy boom at the beginning of the 1980s. Among her television credits are the BBC2 sketch series Naked Video and BBC One's Absolutely Fabulous, in which she played the role of Catriona.

In 2015 her comedy novel Losing It was published by Pan Macmillan. It was nominated for the P. G. Wodehouse Comedy Literary Award and the Edinburgh Book Festival First Book Award.

Early life
Helen Lederer was born on 24 September 1954 in Carmarthen, Wales to an English mother and Czech-Jewish father. Her father was born in 1926 in Teplice, Czechoslovakia, and many of her relatives did not survive the Holocaust. Lederer's paternal grandfather, Arnost, worked as a clandestine listener to German prisoners of war at Trent Park in North London during World War II. She was raised in Eltham, south east London and was educated at Blackheath High School (then a direct grant grammar school) and the Central School of Speech and Drama. She also studied at University of Hertfordshire.

She has a BA in applied social science and received an honorary doctorate from Middlesex University.

Career
Lederer was the only woman to write and perform in BBC Radio 4's In One Ear. Produced by Jamie Rix with Clive Mantle and Nick Wilton, it won the Sony Award for best comedy and progressed to the TV version called Hello Mum.

Lederer established a stand-up act at the Comedy Store in London and then won minor parts in episodes of The Young Ones, which had been written by her Comedy Store contemporaries Ben Elton and Rik Mayall. She would be linked with this scene for the rest of the 1980s, with a supporting role as housemaid Flossie in Happy Families and numerous appearances in related shows and live performances.

Lederer broke from the Comedy Store wing of the alternative scene in 1986 to take part in the BBC2 sketch show Naked Video, which had originated without Lederer on the radio in Scotland. Lederer played various roles, including that of a newsreader linking spoof headlines into clips which acted as punchlines, and a drunk Sloane who performed a monologue in each episode from a wine bar. In the 1980s she reprised her Sloane role in a series of television adverts for Warninks Advocaat, with voice-overs by Stephen Fry.

In the 1990s, Lederer was recruited by her old contemporaries Mayall and Ade Edmondson to play supporting roles in two episodes of their sitcom Bottom, including a memorable part as a fallen millionairess on the make. Simultaneously, she played Catriona in Absolutely Fabulous, joining forces again with Jennifer Saunders. She had previously worked with Saunders and her comedy partner Dawn French in their sketch show French and Saunders, as well as Happy Families and the ITV sitcom Girls on Top. She also guest-acted in the Gregor Fisher sitcom The Baldy Man.

Lederer has always been a guest or supporting actress on programmes devised by or starring her alternative comedy contemporaries and as such has made a good, consistent career. She was one of the first female stand-up comedians to feature on ITV's Saturday Night Live with her own stand up set. She then took part in The Vagina Monologues on the West End stage. Following ‘The House of Blue leaves’ at the Lilian Baylis Theatre with the late Denis Quilley. ‘Having a Ball’ by Alan Bleasdale at the Comedy Theatre, she then appeared in The Killing of Sister George at the Arts Theatres and Calendar Girls with Kelly Brook at the Wyndham's Theatre.

As a presenter, Lederer has hosted and voiced lifestyle, religious and children's programmes. She has appeared on numerous radio panel games including Quote... Unquote, The News Quiz and Just a Minute and writes columns for newspapers and magazines. She wrote and starred in radio shows Life with Lederer and All Change at BBC Radio 4. In December 2009 Lederer appeared on Eggheads and went head-to-head against Kevin Ashman.

Lederer was one of eight celebrities who spent a week learning Welsh in an eco-friendly chic campsite in Pembrokeshire for the S4C television series cariad@iaith:love4language shown in July 2011. She appeared in the 2011 British live-action 3D family comedy film Horrid Henry: The Movie, as the title character's aunt Rich Aunt Ruby.

In 2013 Lederer played Miss Bowline-Hitch in the children's television series Old Jack's Boat on the CBeebies channel. This role was alongside veteran actor Bernard Cribbins, playing the role of Jack, and supporting actors Freema Agyeman and Janine Duvitski.

In January 2013 she was a contestant on ITV celebrity diving show Splash!, but was eliminated in the first round. In October 2013 she played the midwife Mariam in Hollyoaks who was responsible for a baby-swap scandal, a role she reprised in 2015 before being killed off by the "Gloved Hand Killer".

In February 2015 Lederer appeared, as grieving widow Safia, in the BBC soap opera series Doctors. She has also appeared on Celebrity MasterChef, Loose Women and Countdown.

In 2017 she competed in Celebrity Big Brother 20, eventually becoming the 7th housemate to be evicted. In 2018 the BBC launched the comedy podcast series Knock Knock, in which she talks with guest comedians from across the UK.

Lederer appears in the 2018 short film To Trend on Twitter in aid of young people with cancer charity CLIC Sargent with fellow comedians Reece Shearsmith, Steve Pemberton, David Baddiel and actor Jason Flemyng.

In 2019 she hosted the Women in Comedy panel at Wilderness festival.

Comedy Women in Print award

In 2018, Lederer launched a new literary prize for comic fiction written by women. The 2019 winner of the CWIP award was The Exact Opposite of Okay by Laura Steven. The 2020 awards added a humorous graphic novel prize.

The award was created because of dissatisfaction with the Bollinger Everyman Wodehouse Prize, which was not awarded in 2018 and had up to that point only been won by a woman three times.

Personal life

Lederer has married twice and has a daughter, Hannah Lederer-Alton, with her first husband, journalist and former editor of The Observer, Roger Alton. Her second husband is Chris Browne, a GP. Lederer is an ambassador for the Prince's Trust, Eve Appeal Gynaecological Cancer Charity and cancer charity GO Girls.

Her daughter Hannah Lederer-Alton played Abi (Jason Donovan’s daughter) in the TV series  Echo Beach.

Television and film appearances

Pointless Celebrities (2018)
Celebrity Big Brother (2017)
Absolutely Fabulous: The Movie (2016)
Hollyoaks (Mariam, 2013, 2015)
Old Jack's Boat (2013, 2014)
Absolutely Fabulous (1992–2012)
Horrid Henry: The Movie (2011)
The Kid (2010)
Agatha Christie's Marple (2009)
Hotel Trubble
Big Brother's Bit on the Side
Fat Slags
Casualty (1992–2011)
Love Soup
Girls on Top
The New Statesman
Iconicles
Naked Video (1986)
Sooty Heights
French and Saunders (1988–1998)
Heart Beat
Virtual Murder
Filthy Rich & Catflap
Saturday Night Live
One Foot in the Grave (1993)
Bottom (1991–1992)
The Jack Dee Show
Harry Enfield's Television Programme (1992)
Hello Mum (1987)
Happy Families (1985)
The Young Ones (1984)
Murder Most Horrid
A Day Full of Animals & Songs
Doctors (Maise Oliver, 2021)

References

External links 
 
 

1954 births
Living people
English film actresses
English television actresses
English soap opera actresses
English women comedians
English people of Czech-Jewish descent
People educated at Blackheath High School
Alumni of the Royal Central School of Speech and Drama
Alumni of the University of Hertfordshire
Actresses from London
British women comedians
British comedy writers
British comedy actresses
People from Carmarthen
20th-century English actresses
20th-century English comedians
21st-century English actresses
21st-century English comedians